Washington Square Park is an urban park in Rochester, New York. It contains the Soldiers' and Sailors' Monument, erected in 1892.

History
It was formerly known as Johnson's Square. The land for the park was donated to the public by Elisha Johnson in 1817.

On 1 August 1848, it was the site of a public address by Frederick Douglass. Douglass also spoke there in 1852. 

In 1892, U.S. President Benjamin Harrison spoke at the dedication of the Soldiers' and Sailors' Monument, without mentioning slavery, despite Frederick Douglass's presence next to the podium.

Austin Steward wrote in his Twenty-Two Years a Slave, and Forty Years a Freeman that numerous Black Americans celebrated the end of slavery in New York in Johnson's Square on July 5.

In 2017, the Washington Square Park Neighborhood Association received a $15,000 grant to develop a new Master Plan for the park.

Austrian cannon
An Austrian cannon captured by the Italian army during the Battle of Vittorio Veneto in World War I was given as a gift to Rochester in 1921 by the Italian government. The cannon was given as a symbol of the patriotism of the large Italian immigrant population in Rochester at the time. At least 1,400 Rochester residents Italian descent fought in the war. The cannon was restored and rededicated in 2017 in time for the centenary of World War I.

See also 
 Gradual Emancipation Law of 1817

References

External links 
 

Parks in Monroe County, New York
1817 establishments in New York (state)